Gaëtan Arib (born 2 November 1999) is a French professional footballer who plays as a midfielder.

Professional career
Arib made his professional debut with Valenciennes FC in a 4–0 Ligue 2 loss to Clermont Foot on 31 August 2018.

Personal life
Born in France, Arib is of Algerian descent.

References

External links
 
 

1999 births
Living people
People from Saint-Saulve
French sportspeople of Algerian descent
Sportspeople from Nord (French department)
French footballers
Association football midfielders
Ligue 2 players
Championnat National 3 players
Valenciennes FC players
Segunda División B players
Las Rozas CF players
French expatriate footballers
French expatriate sportspeople in Spain
Expatriate footballers in Spain
Footballers from Hauts-de-France